Nicrophorinae is a subfamily of burying beetles or carrion beetles. It contains only one tribe, Nicrophorini.

Genera
This beetle subfamily contains the following genera:

Extant Genera
Eonecrophorus Kurosawa, 1985
Nicrophorus Fabricius, 1775
Ptomascopus Kraatz, 1876

Extinct Genera
↑Palaeosilpha Flach, 1890

References

Silphidae